Kireyevsky brothers may refer to:
Ivan Kireyevsky (1806–1856)
Pyotr Kireevsky (1808–1856)